Underground culture is a term to describe various alternative cultures which either consider themselves different from the mainstream of society and culture, or are considered so by others.

Underground culture may also refer to:

Underground art, art with a following independent of commercial success
Underground comix, a small press or self-published alternative comic books
Underground film, cinema outside the commercial mainstream
Underground music, music with a following despite moderate commercial success
Underground hip hop, a style of hip hop music
Underground dance music, a style of techno music
Underground press, the alternative print media in the late 1960s and early 1970s
Prague underground (culture), an underground culture movement in Prague, Czechoslovakia
UK underground, a 1960s countercultural movement in the United Kingdom
Ukrainian underground, a movement in the Soviet period of Ukraine

See also
 Underground (disambiguation)